Gropniţa is a commune in Iași County, Western Moldavia, Romania. It is composed of six villages: Bulbucani, Forăști, Gropnița, Mălăești, Săveni and Sângeri.

References

Communes in Iași County
Localities in Western Moldavia